Bryan Barbin (born February 2, 1957) was elected to the Pennsylvania House of Representatives for District 71 in 2008 as a Democrat. He resides in Johnstown and represents Cambria County. He is also a lawyer.

On March 9, 2009, he introduced legislation for volunteer firefighters to pay for emergency medical services training.

References

1957 births
Living people
Members of the Pennsylvania House of Representatives
21st-century American politicians